José Díaz Pablo (born 18 March 1945) is a Spanish retired footballer who played as a forward, and is a former manager.

Playing career
Born in Madrid, Díaz Pablo first arrived in Segunda División in 1967 with CF Badalona. He made his professional debut on 12 November 1967, starting in a 1–1 home draw against CE Europa.

In the 1968 summer Díaz Pablo moved to Onteniente CF, also in the second division. He scored his first professional goal on 29 September, but in a 1–2 away loss against Real Valladolid.

Díaz Pablo subsequently represented AD Alcorcón, and retired with the club.

Managerial career
Immediately after retiring Díaz Pablo started working as a manager, coaching his former club Alcorcón's youth setup. He was promoted to the main squad in 1982, and was also in charge of the club for a further two spells, aside from spells at neighbouring sides CD Leganés and Talavera CF.

References

External links

1945 births
Living people
Footballers from Madrid
Spanish footballers
Association football forwards
Segunda División players
Tercera División players
CF Badalona players
Ontinyent CF players
RSD Alcalá players
Getafe Deportivo players
AD Alcorcón footballers
Spanish football managers
AD Alcorcón managers
CD Leganés managers